Amexicano is a drama film directed by Matthew Bonifacio and written by Carmine Famiglietti. The film explores the relationship between a blue-collar Italian-American man and an illegal Mexican immigrant as they both try to make a living in Queens, New York. It world premiered at the 2007 Tribeca Film Festival and won the Jury Award for producer/director Matthew Bonifacio in the category of Narrative Film at the 2007 Sonoma Valley Film Festival. It was released theatrically in 2008.

References

External links 
 
 
 Reviews
 The Village Voice
 New York Times
 NY Daily News
 Variety

2007 films
2007 drama films
American drama films
2000s English-language films
2000s American films